The Israel men's national basketball team represents Israel in international basketball tournaments. They are administered by the Israeli Basketball Association. Israel is currently ranked 33rd in the FIBA World Ranking.

Israel has qualified for the EuroBasket 30 times throughout their history. They have also made two appearances at the World Cup, and one at the Summer Olympics. Israel also participated at the Asian Games from 1966 to 1974. The most success Israel has had on the international stage to date, is finishing as the runners-up at EuroBasket 1979, as well as winning two gold medals (1966, 1974), and one silver medal (1970) at the Asian Games.

History

1952 Olympic Games

The Israeli national team played in their first international competition at the 1952 Olympic Games. However, the team would quickly be ousted in the preliminary tournament, with an (0–2) record and loses to the Philippines, and Greece.

EuroBasket 1953

Israel made their European Basketball Championship debut at EuroBasket 1953 in Moscow. In the preliminary round, the Israeli squad won their group by tie-breaker after being one of three teams to finish with a (3–1) record. They then advanced to the final round, managing to defeat perennial power Czechoslovakia, and getting revenge on Yugoslavia for their only preliminary round loss. Their record in the final round was (4–3), putting them in a 4-way tie for second place behind the undefeated Soviet Union. Israel eventually came out on the bottom of that tie-breaker, finishing in 5th place of the 17 teams.

Israel's overall record of seven wins and four losses included two wins by forfeit over Lebanon (in the preliminary round) and Egypt (in the final round), each of which had refused to play against Israel due to political reasons.

1954 World Cup
Israel reached the World Cup for the first time in 1954. The national team would be placed in Group D in the preliminary round, where they would finish in a 3-way tie, after splitting their two games. They would ultimately secure a spot in the final round based on point difference. There Israel would be overwhelmed, as they dropped six of their seven matches to accumulate an (1–6) record, with their only win coming in a 48–45 overtime victory against France. Israel would end their inaugural appearance at the tournament in 8th place.

1966 Asian Games

Israel appeared at the Asian Games for the first time in 1966. Being drawn into Group B in the preliminary round of the tournament, the national team throttled Iran in the first game 87–55. After that result, Israel would go on to finish out the rest of the round with an (4–1) record, to move on. In the semi-finals, Israel breezed passed Japan 57–34 to reach the title game. In the final, Israel capped their run through the competition by dismantling Thailand 90–42 to capture their first gold medal at the Asian Games.

1970 Asian Games
Heading into the 1970 Asian Games, Israel looked to repeat their performance from 1966. Israel swept their preliminary phase opponents to make it to the final stage. Sitting at (3–0), Israel looked dominant in their first three wins, and appeared poised to become back-to-back Asian Games champions. After winning their first seven games of the final round, Israel needed one more win to finish with a flawless record, and take home the gold. However, South Korea prevented it all from happening, defeating Israel convincingly 81–67. The result landed the team into a second-place finish overall.

1974 Asian Games
The 1974 Asian Games would be the final appearance for Israel at the tournament. The team looked to achieve the gold medal once more before departing. Israel easily made it through the first two rounds to an (3–0) record, setting up an clash in the semi-finals. There the team went up against the Philippines, and outlasted them in a high scoring affair 123–101, to reach the final. In the title game South Korea awaited Israel once again, who was determined to avenge their lost to them at the prior Asian Games in 1970. This time around Israel would come out as champions, winning a hard-fought tussle 92–85 to reclaim the gold medal one last time.

EuroBasket 1979
The EuroBasket 1979 was the 12th appearance for Israel at the European Basketball Championship. The team began their tournament journey with an opening phase defeat against France. Although the team would refocus, and win their next two matches against Poland, and Yugoslavia. The (2–1) record the team achieved was enough to advance to the final stage of the competition. There the team won three out of their five games, two finish in second place in the group, only behind the Soviet Union. This result gave Israel their first medal finish at the tournament.

1986 World Cup
Israel qualified for their second World Cup appearance in 1986. The national team was drawn into Group B in the preliminary phase. Their first game of the tournament was an 79–84 win against Uruguay. Israel would go on to attain second place in group play with an (3–2) record, to move on to the next round. However, Israel was not as successful in this phase, as they would finish up with a losing record (2–3) to be relegated to the classification round. There they went (1–1) to come in 7th place at the competition overall.

EuroBasket 2017
Israel won the rights to be one of four co-hosts for EuroBasket 2017. With Israel hosting Group B in Tel Aviv, the team went up against Italy in their first game, and were thoroughly dominated in an 69–48 defeat. Heading into their second game of the tournament, Israel had Lithuania standing in their way. Israel ran out to an early first period lead, but the team could not maintain the momentum, as they fell to (0–2) and desperately needing a win in their next game. Germany was the opponent for the national team in their third match of group play, and they were victorious in a remarkable 80–82 win. Sitting with an (1–2) record, Israel were intent to even it all up with their game against Georgia. However, even behind the strong performance from Gal Mekel, and his 23 points were not enough. Israel would lose a heartbreaker in overtime 91–104. Their last game of group play, and positions nearly determined, Israel would fall once more. This time at the hands of Ukraine, 88–64, to end the tournament with an (1–4) record.

2019 World Cup qualification
During the process for Israel to reach the 2019 World Cup, the team went through World Cup qualifiers, where they were drawn into Group H for the first round of qualifiers. Israel's first game was a comfortable 88–68 win at home against Estonia. Heading to play Greece on the road in their next game, the team looked to move to (2–0). Although Greece would have none of it, as they dominated Israel 82–61, dropping the team to a record of (1–1). Israel would eventually get things on track, as they finished the rest of group play at (3–3), enough to advance to the second and final round of qualifying.

For the second round of World Cup qualifying, Israel was placed into Group L. Their first two matches of group play were tough loses against Georgia, and Germany. Although they eventually picked up an impressive win in their third game at home versus Serbia. Unfortunately, the national team would only earn one more victory during the rest of the qualifiers, which saw their hopes at (5–7) and clinching qualification vanish.

Honours
Medals table

Competitive record

FIBA World Cup

Olympic Games

Asian Games

EuroBasket

Results and fixtures

2021

2022

2023

Team

Current roster
Roster for the 2023 FIBA World Cup Qualifiers matches on 24 and 27 February 2023 against Finland and Slovenia.

Depth chart

Notable players
Current notable players who have played for the national team:

}

}

|}

|valign="top" |
 Legend
Club – describes lastclub on 11 November 2022
Age – describes ageon 11 November 2022
|}

Head coach position

Past rosters

1952 Olympic Games: finished 20th among 23 teams

3 Avraham Schneor, 4 Zacharia Ofri, 5 Daniel Levy, 6 Menahem Korman, 8 Amos Linkowsky, 9 Shimon Szmuckler, 10 Yehuda Wiener, 11 Ralph Klein, 12 Reuben Perach, 13 Eliahu Amiel, 14 Dan Boksenbaum, 15 Marcel Hefez (Coach: Jacob Saltiel)

1953 EuroBasket: finished 5th among 17 teams

3 Avraham Schneor, 4 Zacharia Ofri, 5 Daniel Levy, 6 Menahem Korman, 7 Alfred Cohen, 8 David Heiblum, 9 Shimon Szmuckler, 10 Ernst Winer, 11 Ralph Klein, 12 Marcel Hefez, 13 Mark Mimran, 14 Dan Boksenbaum, 15 Reuben Perach (Coach: Jacob Saltiel)

1954 FIBA World Cup: finished 8th among 12 teams

3 Avraham Schneor, 4 Zacharia Ofri, 5 Daniel Moshe, 6 Reuben Perach, 7 Alfred Cohen, 8 Tavil Israel, 9 Shimon Shelah, 10 Yehuda Gafni, 11 Rafael Ram, 12 Marcel Hefez, 13 Azriel Luboshitz, 14 Dan Erez (Coach: Jacob Saltiel)

1959 EuroBasket: finished 11th among 17 teams

3 Avraham Schneor, 4 Albert Hemmo, 6 Haim Kastan, 7 Amos Lin, 9 David Tari, 10 Jacob Edelist, 11 Ralph Klein, 12 Igal Volodarsky, 13 David Kaminsky, 14 Haim Hazan, 15 Erez Lustig, 16 Shabetai Ben-Bassat (Coach: Eli Amtel)

1961 EuroBasket: finished 11th among 19 teams

4 Tanhum Cohen-Mintz, 5 Erez Lustig, 6 Ami Shelef, 7 Hanoch Barkon, 8 Albert Hemmo, 9 Offer Eshed, 10 David Kaminsky, 11 Ralph Klein, 12 David Tari, 13 Abraham Hoffman, 14 Haim Hazan, 15 Igal Volodarsky (Coach: Yehoshua Rozin)

1963 EuroBasket: finished 9th among 16 teams

4 Tanhum Cohen-Mintz, 5 Offer Eshed, 6 Ami Shelef, 7 Zvi Lubezki, 8 Albert Hemmo, 9 Abraham Gutt, 10 Igal Volodarsky, 11 Ralph Klein, 12 Shlomo Ben-Zeev, 13 Abraham Hoffman, 14 Haim Hazan, 15 Ilan Zeiger (Coach: Yehoshua Rozin)

1965 EuroBasket: finished 6th among 16 teams

4 Tanhum Cohen-Mintz, 5 Offer Eshed, 6 Ami Shelef, 7 Zvi Lubezki, 8 Albert Hemmo, 9 Igal Volodarsky, 10 Abraham Gutt, 11 David Kaminsky, 12 Gideon Freitag, 13 Abraham Hoffman, 14 Haim Hazan, 15 Ilan Zeiger (Coach: Shimon Shelah)

1966 Asian Games: finished 1st  among 11 teams

4 Amnon Avidan, 5 Tanhum Cohen-Mintz, 6 Igal Dar, 7 Gershon Dekel, 8 Offer Eshed, 9 Abraham Gutt, 10 David Kaminsky, 11 Zvi Lubezki, 12 Itshak Shachar, 13 Ami Shelef, 14 Haim Starkman, 15 Ilan Zohar (Coach: Shimon Shelah)

1967 EuroBasket: finished 8th among 16 teams

4 Tanhum Cohen-Mintz, 5 Offer Eshed, 6 Gabi Teichner, 7 Willie Wold, 8 Shamuel Avishar, 9 Igal Dar, 10 Abraham Gutt, 11 Gershon Dekel, 12 David Kaminsky, 13 Abraham Hoffman, 14 Haim Starkman, 15 Ilan Zohar (Coach: Shimon Shelah)

1969 EuroBasket: finished 11th among 12 teams

4 Gabi Teichner, 5 Offer Eshed, 6 Ivan Leshinsky, 7 Giora Dori, 8 Haim Baram, 9 Gabi Neumark, 10 Haim Starkman, 11 Gershon Dekel, 12 David Kaminsky, 13 Itamar Marzel, 14 Mark Turenshine, 15 Ilan Zohar (Coach: Shimon Shelah)

1970 Asian Games: finished 2nd  among 12 teams

4 Dan Barzily, 5 Tanhum Cohen-Mintz, 6 Hillel Gilboa, 7 Ronald Green, 8 Hanan Keren, 9 Ivan Leshinsky, 10 Itamar Marzel, 11 Gabi Neumark, 12 Mike Schwartz, 13 Haim Starkman, 14 Gabi Teichner, 15 Mark Turenshine (Coach: Shimon Shelah)

1971 EuroBasket: finished 11th among 12 teams

4 Joseph Leja, 5 Gabi Teichner, 6 Tal Brody, 7 Mark Turenshine, 8 Hanan Keren, 9 Mike Schwartz, 10 Haim Starkman, 11 Zvi Inbar, 12 Dan Barzily, 13 Itamar Marzel, 14 Abraham Zuchman, 15 Boaz Yanai (Coach: Shimon Shelah)

1973 EuroBasket: finished 7th among 12 teams

4 Jonathan Zacks, 5 Shamuel Avishar, 6 Tal Brody, 7 Gur Ben-David, 8 Hanan Keren, 9 Mickey Berkowitz, 10 Barry Leibowitz, 11 Gabi Neumark, 12 Zvi Inbar, 13 Itamar Marzel, 14 Jacob Eisner, 15 Boaz Yanai (Coach: Abraham Hemmo)

1974 Asian Games: finished 1st  among 11 teams

4 Motti Aroesti, 5 Shamuel Avishar, 6 Mickey Berkowitz, 7 Tal Brody, 8 Jacob Eisner, 9 Hanan Keren, 10 Itamar Marzel, 11 Avigdor Moskowitz, 12 Shamuel Nachmias, 13 Shuki Schwartz, 14 Boaz Yanai, 15 Shmaryahu Zaslevsky (Coach: Abraham Hemmo)

1975 EuroBasket: finished 7th among 12 teams

4 Shlomo Blum, 5 Shamuel Nachmias, 6 Tal Brody, 7 Shuki Schwartz, 8 Hanan Keren, 9 Mickey Berkowitz, 10 Barry Leibowitz, 11 Avigdor Moskowitz, 12 Or Goren, 13 Itamar Marzel, 14 Jacob Eisner, 15 Boaz Yanai (Coach: Abraham Hemmo)

1977 EuroBasket: finished 5th among 12 teams

4 Shamuel Nachmias, 5 Shuki Schwartz, 6 Or Goren, 7 Pinhas Hozez, 8 Hanan Keren, 9 Mickey Berkowitz, 10 Barry Leibowitz, 11 Avigdor Moskowitz, 12 Steve Kaplan, 13 Itamar Marzel, 14 Roni Rothschild, 15 Boaz Yanai (Coach: Ralph Klein)

1979 EuroBasket: finished 2nd  among 12 teams

4 Eric Minkin, 5 Shuki Schwartz, 6 Uri Ben-Ari, 7 Motti Aroesti, 8 Lou Silver,9 Mickey Berkowitz (MVP), 10 Barry Leibowitz, 11 Avigdor Moskowitz, 12 Steve Kaplan, 13 Shai Sharf, 14 Pinhas Hozez, 15 Boaz Yanai (Coach: Ralph Klein)

1981 EuroBasket: finished 6th among 12 teams

4 Jim Boatwright, 5 John Willis, 6 Haim Zlotikman, 7 Gal Knaz, 8 Steve Schlachter, 9 Mickey Berkowitz, 10 Barry Leibowitz, 11 Avigdor Moskowitz, 12 Lou Silver, 13 Doron Jamchi, 14 Pinhas Hozez, 15 Boaz Yanai (Coach: Ralph Klein)

1983 EuroBasket: finished 6th among 12 teams

4 Howard Lassoff, 5 Israel Elimelech, 6 Lou Silver, 7 Motti Aroesti, 8 Steve Schlachter, 9 Miki Berkovich, 10 Haim Zlotikman, 11 Shmuel Zisman, 12 Doron Jamchi, 13 Ofer Yaakobi, 14 Niv Bogin, 15 John Willis (Coach: Ralph Klein)

1985 EuroBasket: finished 9th among 12 teams

4 Amir Bino, 5 Motti Daniel, 6 Ofer Yaakobi, 7 Motti Aroesti, 8 Steve Schlachter, 9 Miki Berkovich, 10 Haim Zlotikman, 11 Shmuel Zisman, 12 Doron Jamchi, 13 Hen Lippin, 14 Pinhas Hozez, 15 Johan Willis (Coach: Zvi Sherf)

1986 FIBA World Cup: finished 7th among 24 teams

4 Howard Lassoff, 5 Motti Daniel, 6 Adi Gordon, 7 Nir Rechlis, 8 Ariel Rosenberg, 9 Miki Berkovich, 10 Hen Lippin, 11 Doron Shefa, 12 Doron Jamchi, 13 LaVon Mercer, 14 Tomer Steinhauer, 15 Ofer Yaakobi (Coach: Zvi Sherf)

1987 EuroBasket: finished 11th among 12 teams

4 Howard Lassoff, 5 Motti Daniel, 6 Adi Gordon, 7 Nadav Henefeld, 8 Ofer Fleisher, 9 Ariel Rosenberg, 10 Hen Lippin, 11 Doron Shefa, 12 Doron Jamchi, 13 LaVon Mercer, 14 Tomer Steinhauer, 15 Itzhak Cohen (Coach: Zvi Sherf)

1993 EuroBasket: finished 14th among 16 teams

4 Nadav Henefeld, 5 Ofer Fleisher, 6 Israel Elimelech, 7 Desi Barmore, 8 Shimon Amsalem, 9 Adi Gordon, 10 Tomer Steinhauer, 11 Doron Sheffer, 12 Doron Jamchi, 13 Amir Katz, 14 Lior Arditty, 15 Motti Daniel (Coach: Zvi Sherf)

1995 EuroBasket: finished 10th among 14 teams

4 Nadav Henefeld, 5 Ofer Fleisher, 6 Guy Goodes, 7 Brad Leaf, 8 Dror Cohen, 9 Adi Gordon, 10 Amir Muchtary, 11 Doron Sheffer, 12 Doron Jamchi, 13 Kobi Balul, 14 Lior Arditty, 15 Motti Daniel (Coach: Zvi Sherf)

1997 EuroBasket: finished 9th among 16 teams

4 Nadav Henefeld, 5 Lior Arditty, 6 Shalom "Puppy" Turgeman, 7 Amir Muchtary, 8 David Bernsley, 9 Oren Aharoni, 10 Oded Kattash, 11 Doron Sheffer, 12 Gur Shelef, 13 Uri Cohen-Mintz, 14 Tomer Steinhauer, 15 Ofer Fleisher (Coach: Zvi Sherf)

1999 EuroBasket: finished 12th among 16 teams

4 Nadav Henefeld, 5 Motti Daniel, 6 Guy Goodes, 7 Shalom "Puppy" Turgeman, 8 Shimon Amsalem, 9 Meir Tapiro, 10 Oded Kattash, 11 Doron Sheffer, 12 Gur Shelef, 13 Uri Cohen-Mintz, 14 Tomer Steinhauer, 15 Yoav Saffar (Coach: Muli Katzurin)

2001 EuroBasket: finished 12th among 16 teams

4 Israel Sheinfeld, 5 Shahar Gordon, 6 Derrick Sharp, 7 Shalom Turgeman, 8 Lior Lubin, 9 Ido Kozikaro, 10 Afik Nissim, 11 Meir Tapiro, 12 Yoav Saffar, 13 Barak Peleg, 14 Yaniv Green, 15 Moshe Mizrahi (Coach: Muli Katzurin)

2003 EuroBasket: finished 7th among 16 teams

4 Erez Katz, 5 Yotam Halperin, 6 Derrick Sharp, 7 Moshe Mizrahi, 8 Israel Sheinfeld, 9 Gur Shelef, 10 Tal Burstein, 11 Meir Tapiro, 12 Yoav Saffar, 13 Ido Kozikaro, 14 Yaniv Green, 15 Shahar Gordon (Coach: Muli Katzurin)

2005 EuroBasket: finished 11th among 16 teams

4 Dror Hajaj, 5 Afik Nissim, 6 Sharon Shason, 7 Chris Watson, 8 Erez Markovich, 9 Gur Shelef, 10 Tal Burstein, 11 Meir Tapiro, 12 Moshe Mizrahi, 13 Ido Kozikaro, 14 Yaniv Green, 15 Yotam Halperin (Coach: Zvi Sherf)

2007 EuroBasket: finished 11th among 16 teams

4 Dror Hajaj, 5 Moran Roth, 6 Yotam Halperin, 7 Lior Eliyahu, 8 Erez Markovich, 9 Jeron Roberts, 10 Guy Pnini, 11 Meir Tapiro, 12 Matan Naor, 13 Ido Kozikaro, 14 Yaniv Green, 15 Amit Tamir (Coach: Zvi Sherf)

2009 EuroBasket: finished 14th among 16 teams

4 Moran Roth, 5 Yuval Naimy, 6 Gal Mekel, 7 Raviv Limonad, 8 Guy Pnini, 9 Yotam Halperin, 10 Tal Burstein, 11 Lior Eliyahu, 12 Moshe Mizrahi, 13 Ido Kozikaro, 14 Yaniv Green, 15 Amit Tamir (Coach: Zvi Sherf)

2011 EuroBasket: finished 13th among 24 teams

4 Yogev Ohayon, 5 Afik Nissim, 6 Yuval Naimy, 7 David Blu, 8 Guy Pnini, 9 Gal Mekel, 10 Tal Burstein (C), 11 Lior Eliyahu, 12 Yotam Halperin, 13 Elishay Kadir, 14 Yaniv Green, 15 Uri Kokia (Coach: Arik Shivek)

2013 EuroBasket: finished 21st among 24 teams

4 Raviv Limonad, 5 Afik Nissim, 6 Nitzan Hanochi, 7 Alex Tyus, 8 Lior Eliyahu, 9 Omri Casspi, 10 Guy Pnini, 11 Yogev Ohayon, 12 Yotam Halperin, 13 Ido Kozikaro, 14 Yaniv Green, 15 Elishay Kadir (Coach: Arik Shivek)

2015 EuroBasket: finished 10th among 24 teams

5 Dagan Yivzori, 6 Shawn Dawson, 7 Gal Mekel, 8 Lior Eliyahu, 9 Omri Casspi (C), 10 Raviv Limonad, 11 Elishay Kadir, 12 Yogev Ohayon, 14 Yaniv Green, 15 D'or Fischer, 16 Robert Rothbart, 23 Bar Timor (Coach: Erez Edelstein)

2017 EuroBasket: finished 21st among 24 teams

1 Richard Howell, 6 Shawn Dawson, 7 Gal Mekel, 8 Lior Eliyahu, 9 Omri Casspi (C), 10 Guy Pnini, 11 Elishay Kadir, 12 Yotam Halperin,14 Oz Blayzer, 15 Bar Timor, 20 Idan Zalmanson, 21 Yogev Ohayon  (Coach: Erez Edelstein)

2022 EuroBasket: finished 17th among 24 teams

4 Roman Sorkin, 7 Gal Mekel, 8 Deni Avdija, 10 Guy Pnini (C), 11 Yam Madar, 12 Rafi Menco, 15 Jake Cohen, 20 Idan Zalmanson,30 Nimrod Levi, 41 Tomer Ginat, 45 Tamir Blatt, 50 Yovel Zoosman  (Coach: Guy Goodes)

Kit

Manufacturer
2015: Peak

See also

Sport in Israel
Israel women's national basketball team
Israel men's national under-20 basketball team
Israel men's national under-18 basketball team
Israel men's national under-16 basketball team
Israel national 3x3 team
Israeli Basketball Premier League

References

External links

 
Israel FIBA profile 
Israel National Team – Men at Eurobasket.com
Israel Basketball Records at FIBA Archive

Videos
Israel v Poland – Group D – Full Game – 2023 FIBA World Cup European Qualifiers YouTube.com video

 
 
Men's national basketball teams
1939 establishments in Mandatory Palestine
Basketball teams established in 1939